is a Japanese manga series written and illustrated by Uoto. It was serialized in Shogakukan's seinen manga magazine Weekly Big Comic Spirits from September 2020 to April 2022, with its chapters collected in eight tankōbon volumes. An anime adaptation by Madhouse has been announced.

Plot
The manga is set in 15th century "P Kingdom". People who suggest ideas in opposition to the teachings of the "C religion", such as that the Earth revolves around the Sun, are considered heretics, and are tortured or burned at the stake. Rafal, a child prodigy with an interest in astronomy, is forced by Hubert, a scholar and heretic, to assist him in his research for the "about the movement of the Earth" theory. When Novak, an inquisitor, finds a diagram drawn by Rafal showing a heliocentric model, Hubert claims responsibility and is executed, leaving Rafal a spherical pendant. Rafal uses the pendant to find Hubert's hidden research materials on the theory. Rafal continues Hubert's research, but is informed on by his foster father, Potocki. At his inquisition, Rafal refuses to denounce the theory, committing suicide by ingesting poppy seeds.

Ten years later, Okgi and Gallus, two duelists, are assigned to guard a heretic during transportation. The heretic reveals the location of the research to them, dying to protect Okgi from Novak. The pair decide to seek out a demoted priest, Badeni, to help make sense of the material. While on a bridge, it collapses, and Gallus entrusts their mission and the pendant to Okgi before dying. Okgi meets Badeni, who agrees to look at the materials in exchange for Okgi continuing Gallus' astronomical observations. Badeni finds the materials to be incomplete and requiring the use of more records. They post a problem at public boards in the city and find a girl, Jolanta, answering it on the same day. Jolanta, a researcher, agrees to cooperate with them by introducing them to Piast, an ardent advocate of the Ptolemaic model. After Okgi observes Venus waxing, Piast agrees to give the group access to his records. Using Piast's records, Badeni finishes the theory. Novak catches on to the group, inspecting Badeni's cabin and noticing the pendant. Okgi holds off the inquisitors, but him and Badeni are captured. Novak tortures Okgi, forcing Badeni to divulge the location of the research materials, and the two are executed. Antoni, a rival of Novak, attempts to get Jolanta, Novak's daughter, convicted as a heretic, but she is freed by an inquisitor. Cklamovski, a priest at Badeni's church, discovers that Badeni had transcribed a diary written by Okgi onto the heads of the local vagabonds.

Twenty-five years later, Schmitt, the captain of the Heretic Liberation Force, retrieves Okgi's book under Jolanta's orders, but is forced to leave it in an abandoned village. Draka, a Romani, comes across the book and, seeing an opportunity to profit, burns it, forcing Schmitt to take her along. Draka, in exchange for being allowed to use their printing press, recites the contents of the book to Jolanta. When the group is found by the inquisitors, Jolanta stays behind, blowing herself up.

Media

Manga
Chi: On the Movements of the Earth, written and illustrated by Uoto, was serialized in Shogakukan's seinen manga magazine Weekly Big Comic Spirits from September 14, 2020, to April 18, 2022. Shogakukan collected its chapters in eight tankōbon, released from December 11, 2020, to June 30, 2022.

Seven Seas Entertainment has licensed the manga for English publication. They will publish the manga in an omnibus format.

Volume list

Anime
In June 2022, an anime adaptation produced by Madhouse has been announced.

Other
The manga was featured in the music video for amazarashi's song "1.0" on March 30, 2022, with the video showing lyrics using letterpress printing on art from the series. It was also featured in the music video for amazarashi's song , released on June 30, 2022, with characters from the series and their dialogue being projected onto the planetarium of the Itabashi Science and Education Museum in Tokyo.

Reception
The manga was recommended by manga artists Hitoshi Iwaaki and Shin Takahashi. Chi was nominated for the 14th Manga Taishō in 2021 and placed second with 67 points; it was nominated for the 15th edition and placed fifth with 59 points. It was nominated for the Next Manga Award in 2021 and placed tenth in the print category. The series ranked 37th on the 2021 "Book of the Year" list by Da Vinci magazine; it ranked 21st on the 2022 list. It ranked 2nd on Takarajimasha's Kono Manga ga Sugoi! 2022 list of best manga for male readers. It won the Mandō Kobayashi Manga Grand Prix 2021, created by comedian and manga enthusiast Kendo Kobayashi. The manga was nominated for the 67th Shogakukan Manga Award in the general category in 2021; it has been nominated for the 68th edition in the same category in 2022. The series ranked 5th on the Nationwide Bookstore Employees' Recommended Comics of 2022. The manga was nominated for the 46th Kodansha Manga Award in the general category in 2022. The series won the 26th Tezuka Osamu Cultural Prize in 2022.

Notes

References

Further reading

External links
  
 

Anime series based on manga
Catholicism in fiction
Comics set in Poland
Comics set in the 15th century
Historical anime and manga
Madhouse (company)
Seinen manga
Seven Seas Entertainment titles
Shogakukan manga
Winner of Tezuka Osamu Cultural Prize (Grand Prize)